Marjan Avetisyan  (born on July 9, 1982), is an Armenian actress. She is known for her roles as Miss Tamara on Full House, Lilith on "Vorogayt" (Trapped).

Filmography

Discography

Songs
 2015 Dec — "New Year" (featuring with Full House band` Mihran Tsarukyan, Grigor Danielyan, Gor Hakobyan, Ani Yeranyan, Gor Hakobyan, Moso Karapetyan

External links

References

1982 births
Living people
People from Armavir Province
Armenian film actresses
21st-century Armenian actresses
Armenian stage actresses